Auguste Michel Étienne Regnaud de Saint-Jean d'Angély, later 2nd Count Regnaud de Saint-Jean d'Angély (30 July 1794, Paris – 1 February 1870 Cannes) was a Marshal of France, soldier and politician.

Biography
Auguste was the illegitimate son of Michel-Louis-Étienne, Count Regnaud de Saint-Jean d'Angély, and of his mistress Marie-Louise Chenié, who died shortly after his birth, he was recognised by his father some months later and adopted by the latter's wife in 1795.

Regnaud served as a lieutenant in a regiment of hussars during the campaign of Saxe in 1813. He fought at the Battle of Leipzig, after which he became a member of Emperor Napoleon's personal military staff.

As he had served as a personal officier d'ordonnance to the Emperor at Waterloo, he was dismissed from the army by the Restoration government with the rank of lieutenant. In 1825, he went to Greece, fought in the war of independence and was in charge of the instruction of a cavalry corps in the new Greek army. In 1828, he took part in the Morea expedition of the French army as an interpreter. He was promoted to the rank of captain in 1829.

During the July Monarchy, Regnaud de Saint-Jean d'Angély served as a colonel in the expedition to Belgium. He was promoted to général de brigade in 1841 and to général de division in 1849. In 1848, he was elected deputy and sat on the right. In 1851, he served for a fortnight as minister of war. In 1852, he backed Louis-Napoléon Bonaparte and, as a reward, he was made a senator for life. Under the Second Empire, he went through the Crimean and Italian campaigns, and ultimately was created Marshal of France in 1859 for bravery at the Battle of Magenta.

Family
Marshal Regnaud de Saint-Jean d'Angély married Anne-Angélique Ruby, who bore him no children. He adopted her daughter from a previous marriage, Flore-Angélique Regnaud de Saint-Jean d'Angély.

Since his father never married his mother (who died some months after the redaction of a marriage contract), Regnaud de Saint-Jean d'Angély had not been able to succeed to his title of count. Notwithstanding, Napoléon III granted him the title again in November 1864, with the special permission to pass it at his death to the husband of his adoptive daughter, Edmond Davillier. The latter took the surname "Davillier-Regnaud de Saint-Jean-d'Angély" and was confirmed in the succession of the title of count at the death of his father-in-law. However, it became extinct at his own death in 1908 since he had only a daughter from his marriage with the Marshal's stepdaughter.

Marshal Regnaud de Saint-Jean d'Angély died in Cannes in 1870 and was buried in the Hôtel des Invalides in Paris.

Notes

References

1794 births
1870 deaths
Politicians from Paris
Counts of France
Bonapartists
French Ministers of War
Members of the 1848 Constituent Assembly
Members of the National Legislative Assembly of the French Second Republic
French Senators of the Second Empire
Marshals of France
French military personnel of the Napoleonic Wars
French philhellenes in the Greek War of Independence
French military personnel of the Crimean War
Honorary Knights Grand Cross of the Order of the Bath